The Departmental Council of Corse-du-Sud is the deliberative assembly of the French department of Corse-du-Sud in the region of Corsica. It consists of 22 members (general councilors) from 11 cantons and its headquarters are in Ajaccio.

The President of the General Council is Pierre-Jean Luciani.

Vice-Presidents 

The President of the Departmental Council is assisted by 4 vice-presidents chosen from among the departmental advisers. Each of them has a delegation of authority.

References 

Corse-du-Sud
Corse-du-Sud